Kommunar is a rural locality (a village) in Kaltovsky Selsoviet, Iglinsky District, Bashkortostan, Russia. The population was 19 as of 2010. There are 2 streets.

Geography 
Kommunar is located 35 km southeast of Iglino (the district's administrative centre) by road. Voroshilovskoye is the nearest rural locality.

References 

Rural localities in Iglinsky District